Douglas Robert Nowicki  (born 8 May 1945) is an American Benedictine monk and Catholic priest. From 1991 to 2020, he served as the 11th Archabbot of Saint Vincent Archabbey in Latrobe, Pennsylvania, and by extension, the Chancellor of Saint Vincent College and the Chancellor of Saint Vincent Seminary. Nowicki became solemnly professed on July 11, 1966 and was ordained a priest on May 21, 1972. He served the monastic community and the Diocese of Pittsburgh in various capacities before his election as archabbot in 1991.

Early life and education
Nowicki was born in Everson, Pennsylvania, on May 8, 1945, the son of Sylvester and Evelyn (Jackamonis) Nowicki. He is one of four children.

Nowicki attended Catholic grade schools at Saint Joseph, Everson, and Holy Cross, Youngwood, Pennsylvania. He earned a Bachelor of Arts degree in philosophy from Saint Vincent College in 1968, a Master of Divinity from Saint Vincent Seminary in 1971 and a doctorate in clinical psychology from the University of Tennessee in 1977.

Priesthood
Nowicki was professed as a Benedictine on July 11, 1966, and ordained to the priesthood at the Archabbey Basilica on May 21, 1972 by Bishop William G. Connare of Greensburg. Prior to his election as Archabbot, Nowicki had served for five years as Secretary for Education of the Diocese of Pittsburgh from 1986 to 1991 and Pastor of Our Lady, Queen of Peace Parish, North Side, Pittsburgh from 1984 to 1986. At Saint Vincent College he served as Chairman of the Department of Psychology from 1979 to 1984 and Associate Academic Dean from 1983 to 1984. From 1978 through 1983, he was also a member of the staff in the Behavioral Science Department at Children's Hospital of Pittsburgh. Nowicki also served as a psychological consultant to Mister Rogers' Neighborhood from 1978 to 1984.

Abbacy

Nowicki was first elected by his fellow monks on January 8, 1991 to become the eleventh Archabbot of Saint Vincent. On March 1, 1991, he received the Abbatial Blessing from Anthony G. Bosco, Bishop of Greensburg. Under Nowicki, Saint Vincent Archabbey, College, Seminary and Parish have undergone major developments, including a new bypass and entrance road to the Saint Vincent campus, the Winnie Palmer Nature Reserve, the Fred M. Rogers Center for Early Learning and Children's Media, the Carey Student Center, the Elizabeth Roderick Center and The John and Annette Brownfield Center, a new Apse organ in the Archabbey Basilica along with restoration of the Basilica Crypt, the construction of two college dormitories, Rooney Hall and Saint Benedict Hall, the renovation/restoration of the Archabbey Basilica, construction of a new parish center for Saint Vincent Parish, renovation of Prep Hall and the Latimer Family Library, the establishment of a minority scholarship program named in his honor and the construction of the $40 million Sis and Herman Dupré Science Pavilion.

Coat of arms

References

External links
Saint Vinent Archabbey's Homepage

1945 births
Saint Vincent College
Saint Vincent College alumni
Catholic Church in Pennsylvania
Roman Catholic Diocese of Greensburg
Benedictine abbots
Living people
Roman Catholic Ecclesiastical Province of Philadelphia
American Benedictines
American Roman Catholic priests
Religious leaders from Pennsylvania